The grey-backed tachuri (Polystictus superciliaris) is a species of bird in the family Tyrannidae. It is endemic to Brazil.

Its natural habitats are dry savanna and subtropical or tropical high-altitude shrubland. It is threatened by habitat loss.

References

External links
Gray-backed Tachuri photos  on antpitta.com

grey-backed tachuri
Birds of the Cerrado
Endemic birds of Brazil
grey-backed tachuri
Taxonomy articles created by Polbot